William Andrew Snowden (May 6, 1910 – February 2, 1959) was a NASCAR driver from St. Augustine, Florida, USA. He was one of the racers whose career was interrupted by World War II. He was nicknamed "Wild Bill" and the "Florida Hurricane".

Snowden competed on various circuits before NASCAR was organized, and he had second-place finishes at the Daytona Beach Road Course in 1941 and 1948. He competed in NASCAR's Strictly Stock/Grand National Series (now NASCAR Cup Series) races between the series' inception in 1949 and 1952. He had 15 Top 10 and 5 Top 5 finishes in those 24 races.

NASCAR career
In the series' first year in 1949, he competed in four of the eight events, with three Top 10s and a season-best fifth-place finish at Occoneechee Speedway at Hillsboro, North Carolina. Snowden finished 11th in the season points.

Snowden competed in four events in the next season, finishing 40th in season points with 2 Top 10s. His season-best fifth-place finish happened at Charlotte Speedway.

Snowden had a career-best ninth place season points finish in 1951. In 21 starts, he had 9 Top 10 finishes with two career-best fourth-place finishes at Martinsville Speedway and Speedway Park in Jacksonville.

1952 was Snowden's final season in Grand National. He competed in four events, with one Top 10 with his sixth-place finish at Hayloft Speedway in Augusta, Georgia. Fireball Roberts raced one event in Snowden's car that season, and Banjo Matthews used Snowden's car in three events with one fifth-place finish at Darlington Raceway.

After his retirement from racing, Snowden became a shrimp boat operator. He died on February 2, 1959. In 1992, he was inducted in the Jacksonville Stock Car Racing Hall of Fame.

References

1910 births
1959 deaths
NASCAR drivers
People from St. Augustine, Florida
Racing drivers from Florida